Kevin Brian Bales,  (born 1952), is Professor of Contemporary Slavery at the University of Nottingham, co-author of the Global Slavery Index, and was a co-founder and previously president of Free the Slaves. Free the Slaves is the US sister organization of Anti-Slavery International, the world’s oldest human rights organization.

Professional and academic career
Bales graduated from Ponca City High School in Ponca City, Oklahoma, in 1970. Bales earned his Ph.D. at the London School of Economics in 1994 with a thesis on Early innovations in social research: the Poverty Survey of Charles Booth. He holds a BA in Anthropology from the University of Oklahoma, an MA in Sociology from the University of Mississippi, and an MSc in Economic History from the London School of Economics.

In 1990, Bales teamed with Simon Pell, the Head of Arts for Labour in the UK at the time, to form the fund-raising and research consultancy, Pell & Bales Ltd. The firm raises funds for medical charities, human rights groups, environmental campaigns, overseas development, and the Labour Party. In November 2011 fundraising by the company passed the one billion pound mark (£1,000,000,000 or $1.6 billion).

Bales has since served as a Trustee of Anti-Slavery International and as a consultant to the United Nations Global Program on Trafficking of Human Beings. He has advised the US, British, Irish, Norwegian and Nepali governments and the Economic Community of West African States on matters relating to the formulation of policy on slavery and human trafficking. Bales edited an Anti-Human Trafficking Toolkit for the United Nations, and published a report on forced labor in the US with the Human Rights Center at Berkeley.

In 2015 he was a Professor of Human Rights at the Pozen Family Center for Human Rights at the University of Chicago. From 2001 to 2005 Bales was a visiting Professor of International Studies at the Croft Institute at the University of Mississippi.

Presently, Bales holds the position of Professor of Contemporary Slavery at the University of Nottingham, as well as that of Emeritus Professor of Sociology at Roehampton University in London. He served on the board of directors of the International Cocoa Initiative, and currently serves on the board of the Freedom Fund.

Books
Bales has written extensively on modern slavery. Perhaps his best-known book is Disposable People: New Slavery in the Global Economy (1999; revised edition, 2004, further edition 2012), a firsthand analysis of the operations of five slave-based businesses: prostitution in Thailand, selling of water in Mauritania, production of charcoal in Brazil, general agriculture in India, and brickmaking in Pakistan.  Archbishop Desmond Tutu called the book "a well researched, scholarly and deeply disturbing expose of modern slavery". The book has been published in ten different languages. The book formed the basis for a film, Slavery: A Global Investigation, made by TrueVision in 2000, which won a Peabody Award.

Influences
Martin Albrow's globalization theory and Darren O'Byrne's theories on human rights influenced Bales' research, as has the empirical training he received from Jack Gibbs and Larry DeBord. Some commentators believe his views on modern slavery were anticipated by contributors to the 1970s mode of production debate, and that his work on debt bondage in India and Pakistan was anticipated by the Marxist Tom Brass.

Awards and Recognitions
In 2000 Bales was awarded the Premio Viareggio prize for his services to humanity. In 2003 he received the Human Rights Award from the University of Alberta; in 2004, the Judith Sargeant Murray Award for Human Rights; and in 2005 the Laura Smith Davenport Human Rights Award. In 2006 the association of British Universities named Bales' work as one of the top "100 world-changing discoveries of the last fifty years". Two years later in 2008, Utne Reader named him one of "50 Visionaries Who Are Changing Your World". In 2008 he was also invited to address the Summit of Nobel Peace Laureates in Paris, and to join in the planning of the 2009 Clinton Global Initiative. The following year he was awarded a Prime Mover fellowship, and in 2010 awarded an honorary doctorate by Loyola University of Chicago for "outstanding service on behalf of human rights and social justice."

Most recently, Bales received the 2011 University of Louisville Grawemeyer Award for Improving World Order.

Bales was appointed Companion of the Order of St Michael and St George (CMG) in the 2017 New Year Honours for services to the global antislavery movement.

Selected bibliography

Books 
 Bales, Kevin (1999). Disposable People: New Slavery in the Global Economy (2004; 2012)  
 Bales, Kevin (2005). Understanding Global Slavery: A Reader 
 Bales, Kevin (2005). New Slavery: A Reference Handbook 
 Bales, Kevin (2007). Ending Slavery: How We Free Today's Slaves 
 Bales, Kevin; Trodd, Zoe (2008).  To Plead Our Own Cause: Personal Stories by Today's Slaves 
 Bales, Kevin; Malbert, Roger; Sealy, Mark (2008). Documenting Disposable People: Contemporary Global Slavery 
 Bales, Kevin; Soodalter, Ron (2009). The Slave Next Door: Human Trafficking and Slavery in America Today 
 Bales, Kevin; Trodd, Zoe; Williamson, Alex Kent (2009). Modern Slavery: The Secret World of 27 Million People 
 Bales, Kevin (2016). Blood and Earth: Modern Slavery, Ecocide, and the Secret to Saving the World

Chapters in books 
  and 19 others and 20 articles.

Criticism
In 2007 in response to Kevin Bales' interview with Democracy Now! about Free The Slaves, investigative journalist Christian Parenti wrote a criticism of Bales claiming he had made false claims about the chocolate industry. Specifically, Parenti argues that "Bales goes around fund raising, flogging his book and promoting himself on the basis that he has successfully reformed the chocolate industry and largely halted its use of child labor in West Africa. But no such thing has happened... Bales’ organization FTS defended the chocolate industry when the Department of Labor sought to list cocoa as a product tainted by slave and child labor." Bales' work has also come under critique by sociologist Julia O'Connell Davidson.

References

External links
 
 Speaker's Forum: Kevin Bales - How to End Slavery (audio), KUOW-FM
 
 TED Talk: How to combat modern slavery (TED2010), also on 

Academics of the University of Roehampton
Living people
1952 births
Academics of the University of Nottingham
Companions of the Order of St Michael and St George